Nexterday is the seventh and final studio album released by former lead singer and songwriter of the Cars, Ric Ocasek.

The album boasts a more DIY sound than previous albums, having been partially recorded in Ocasek's home studio with him playing many of the instruments himself.  Musicians featured in his 1982 debut solo album, Beatitude were used on Nexterday, including fellow Cars keyboardist Greg Hawkes, bassist Darryl Jenifer of Bad Brains, drummer/programmer Stephen George and guitarist Roger Greenawalt.

Track listing 
All tracks written by Ric Ocasek.
 "Crackpot"
 "Bottom Dollar"
 "Don't Lose Me"
 "In a Little Bit"
 "Silver"
 "Come On"
 "I'm Thinking"
 "Carousel"
 "Heard About You"
 "Please Don't Let Me Down"
 "It Gets Crazy"

Personnel 

 Stephen George: Drum programming (2)
 Rob Joanisse: Drums (2, 7)
 Greg Hawkes: Keyboards (5); acoustic guitar (8)
 Darryl Jenifer: Bass
 Roger Greenawalt: Guitar (11)
 Ric Ocasek: All other instruments, illustrations

References 

Ric Ocasek albums
2005 albums
Albums produced by Ric Ocasek
Sanctuary Records albums